Premium Collection: The Japan Covers, known as  in Japan, is a cover album by Andrew W.K. The album, consisting of covers of various J-pop songs, was released in Japan by Universal Music Group on November 26, 2008.

The songs were originally marketed as 30-second ringtones and repackaged in their complete versions as this 14-song album.  Andrew W.K. is quoted as saying that this album is a "gift to the Japanese people, for all the incredible warmth and kindness they've given me over the years."

Tracks
"KISEKI" (originally GReeeeN's "Kiseki" [])
"GIROPPON" (originally Nezumi Senpai's "Roppongi ~Giroppon~" [])

"Linda Linda" (originally THE BLUE HEARTS' "Linda Linda" [])

"Runner" (originally by BAKUFU-SLUMP)

"MY FIRST KISS" (originally covered by Hi-STANDARD)

References

External links
ANDREW W.K. DISCOGRAPHY. Track listing at Universal Music Group

Andrew W.K. albums
Covers albums
2008 albums
Universal Records compilation albums